Lemyra spilosomata is a moth of the family Erebidae. It was described by Francis Walker in 1865. It is found in southern India.

References

 

spilosomata
Moths described in 1865